The Saline River is a  river in southeastern Michigan in the United States.  A tributary of the River Raisin, it originates in Washtenaw County; flows through the cities of Saline and Milan, where it enters Monroe County; then joins the River Raisin at the village of Dundee.  Although named after the city of Saline, which was once famous for its salt springs, the Saline River is not at all salty.

See also
List of rivers of Michigan

References

Michigan  Streamflow Data from the USGS

Rivers of Michigan
Rivers of Washtenaw County, Michigan
Rivers of Monroe County, Michigan
Tributaries of Lake Erie